Zsolt Lévai (born 3 August 1965) is a Hungarian rower. He competed in the men's double sculls event at the 1992 Summer Olympics.

References

1965 births
Living people
Hungarian male rowers
Olympic rowers of Hungary
Rowers at the 1992 Summer Olympics
Rowers from Budapest